Club Social Diablos Rojos (sometimes referred as Diablos Rojos (HV)) is a Peruvian football club, playing in the city of Huancavelica, Peru.

History
The Club Social Diablos Rojos was founded on July 14, 1968.

In the 1995 Copa Perú, the club classified to the National Stage, but was eliminated when finished in 6th place.

In the 2003 Copa Perú, the club classified to the Regional Stage, but was eliminated by Deportivo Educación in the Group Stage.

In the 2009 Copa Perú, the club classified to the Regional Stage, but was eliminated by Froebel Deportes in the Group Stage.

In the 2017 Copa Perú, the club classified to the National Stage, but was eliminated by Las Palmas in the Quarterfinals.

Honours

Regional
Liga Departamental de Huancavelica:
Winners (7): 1981, 1983, 1984, 1985, 2003, 2009, 2017

Liga Provincial de Huancavelica:
Winners (7): 1981, 1983, 1984, 1985, 2003, 2009, 2017

Liga Distrital de Huancavelica:
Winners (5): 1978, 1981, 2010, 2011, 2017
Runner-up (2): 2009, 2012

See also
List of football clubs in Peru
Peruvian football league system

References

External links

Football clubs in Peru
Association football clubs established in 1968